Aleksandra Drejgier (born 15 June 1991) is a Polish track cyclist, and part of the national team. She competed in the team sprint event at the 2009 UCI Track Cycling World Championships and also in the team sprint event at the 2010 UCI Track Cycling World Championships.

References

External links
 Profile at cyclingarchives.com

1991 births
Living people
Polish track cyclists
Polish female cyclists
Place of birth missing (living people)